Pontianak Harum Sundal Malam, also known as Pontianak Scent of the Tuber Rose or Fragrant Night Vampire, is a 2004 Malaysian Malay-language horror film directed and written by Shuhaimi Baba. The storyline of the film is a restless female ghost wants to avenge her death.

Produced by Persona Pictures, starring Maya Karin, the film is about a restless spirit (pontianak) Meriam who seeks revenge upon those who killed her. The film was a major box office success in Malaysia.

A sequel, Pontianak Harum Sundal Malam 2, was released on 24 November 2005. It is about Meriam continuing her revenge on the family of Marsani until Zali, a son of Marsani dies for saving her daughter Maria.

Cast
 Maya Karin as Meriam, whose death brought about the Pontianak
 Azri Iskandar as Marsani, Daniel's love rival, Meriam's killer, Zali's father, Asmadi's adopted son, Yuli's husband
 Rosyam Nor as Asmadi, Marsani's adopted son
 Ida Nerina as Sitam, Meriam's caretaker
 Kavita Sidhu as Anna, Norman's wife
 Eizlan Yusof as Norman, Asmadi's adopted son
 Nanu Baharuddin as Laila, Meriam's cousin, Maria's aunt and foster mother, Sitam's friend
 Shahronizam Noor as Daniel, Meriam's husband
 Sharifah Aleya as Rafiah, Asmadi's girlfriend (dead)
 Aziz Sattar as Tok Selampit, Meriam's dance teacher
 Adam Hamid as Man, Meriam's servant
 Yusmal Ghazali as Sarjono, Marsani's bodyguard
 Nadia Mustafar as Yuli, Marsani's wife and Zali's mother
 Adam Corrie as Chong, Marsani's bodyguard
 Soffi Jikan as Amang
 Afdlin Shauki as Penghulu Madura
 Bob Azrai as Orang Madura
 Azwan Ali as Tengku Mahkota Sultan
 Sophia Ibrahim as Datin
 Wahid Satay as Pembesar Istana I
 Aimi Jarr as Pembesar Istana II
 Shah Rezza as Pembesar Istana III
 Sandra Sodhy as Tetamu Istana I
 Rueben Oas as Tetamu Istana II
 Hushairy Hussein as Kassim
 Haiza as Zai, Anna's employee and Asmadi's wife

References

External links
 

2004 films
2004 horror films
2000s ghost films
Malay-language films
Malaysian horror films
Vampires in film
Films directed by Shuhaimi Baba
Pesona Pictures films
Films with screenplays by Shuhaimi Baba
Films produced by Shuhaimi Baba
Malaysian ghost films
Folk horror films